The following is a discography of the Indian musician M. S. Viswanathan (1928–2015). M. S. Viswanathan composed film scores for films in Tamil, Malayalam, Kannada, Telugu and Hindi.

Tamil film

1950s

1960s

1970s

1980s

1990s

2000s

2010s

Malayalam films

 Lanka Dahanam
 Manthrakodi
 Panitheeratha Veedu
 Jesus
 Divya Darsanam
 Chandrakaantham
 Jeevikkan Marannupoya Sthree
 Babu Mon
 Ullasa Yaathra
 Dharmakshetre Kurukshetre
 Aval Oru Thudar Kadha
 Panchami
 Ajayanum Vijayanum
 Yakshagaanam
 Themmadi Velappan
 Rajayogam
 Kuttavum Sikshayum
 Hridayame Saakshi
 Ormakal Marikkumo
 Akshayapaathram
 Rathi Manmadhan
 Amme Anupame
 Parivarthanam
 Sangamam
 Chila Nerangalil Chila Manushyar
 Madhurikkunna Rathri
 Randu Penkuttikal
 Sundarimaarude Swapnangal
 Muhammadum Musthafayum
 Velluvili
 Snehathinte Mukhangal
 Itha Oru Manushyan
 Randilonnu
 Viswaroopam
 Iniyum Kanam
 Indradhanussu
 Simhasanam
 Pathivritha
 Venalil Oru Mazha
 Vadaka Veedu
 Oru Ragam Pala Thalam
 Jeevitham Oru Ganam
 Mani Koya Kurup
 Ezham Kadalinakkare
 Lorry
 Theeram Thedunnavar
 Swarga Devatha
 Avan Oru Ahankaari
 Kolilakkam
 Panchapandavar
 Jeevikkan Padikkanam
 Thirakal Ezhuthiya Kavitha
 Anguram
 Marmaram
 Kaikeyi
 Sneha Bandhanam
 Ariyaatha Veethikal
 Minimol Vathikkanil
 Athirathram
 Thennal Thedunna Poovu
 Idanilangal
 Priyamvadakkoru Pranayageetham
 Amme Bhagavathi
 Bhagavan
 Ariyatha Bandham
 Samskaram
 Kaiyethum Dhoorathu
 Iyer the Great
 Oliyambukal
 Veeralippattu
 Sthreekku Vendi Sthree
 Sabarimalayil Thanka Sooryodayam
 Amma Ammaayiyamma
 Valkannezhuthi (Hold)

Telugu films

 Praja Rajyam (1950)
 Chandirani (1953)
 Ammalakkalau (1953)
 Maa Gopi (1954)
 Santosham (1955)
 Tenali Ramakrishna (1956)
 Bhakta Markandeya (1956)
 Pelli Tamboolam (1961)
 Intiki Deepam Illale (1961)
 Aasa Jeevulu (1962)
 Ammai Kaarisi
 Manchi Chedu (1963)
 Aada Bratuku (1965)
 Leta Manasulu (1966)
 Manase Mandiram (1966)
 Bhale Kodallu (1968)
 Sattekalapu Satteyya (1969)
 Sipayi Chinnayya (1969)
 Memoo Manushulame (1973)
 Premalu Pellillu (1974)
 Anthuleni Katha (1976)
 Chilakamma Cheppindi (1977)
 Moratodu (1977)
 Naalaaga Endaro (1978)
 Simha Baludu (1978)
 Maro Charitra (1978)
 Kukka Katuku Cheppu Debba (1979)
 Andamaina Anubhavam (1979)
 Idi Katha Kaadu (1979)
 Guppedu Manasu (1979)
 Triloka Sundari (1980)
 Ammayi Mogudu Mamaku Yamudu (1980)
 Oorukichchina Maata (1981)
 Aakali Rajyam (1981)
 47 Rojulu (1981)
 Tholi Kodi Koosindi (1981)
 Ramadandu (1981)
 Pelleedu Pillalu (1982)
 Maanasa Veena (1984)
 Chatte Kaladi Chattaiya
 Samrat Ashoka (1992)
 Kokilamma (1983)
 Laila (1989)
 Radhamma Kapuram (also known as Vichitra Pelli) (1990)

Kannada films

 Bhaktha Markandeya (1957)
 Vijayanagarada Veeraputra (1961)
 Makkala Sainya (1980)
 Ganeshana Mahime (1981)
 Benkiyalli Aralida Hoovu (1983)
 Eradu Rekhegalu (1984)
 Balondu Uyyale (1985)
 Mamatheya Madilu (1985)
 Devathe (1986)
 Super Boy (1986)
 Sri Venkateshwara Mahime (1988)
 Manikantana Mahime (1993)

Hindi films 
 Naya aadmi (1956)
 Bachhe Mere Saathi (1972)
 Barah Ghante (1975)
 Pyara Tarana (1982)

Television
Ganga Yamuna Saraswathi
Sherlock Mami

Non-film works

Actor
Films
 Kaadhal Mannan (1998)
 Kaathala Kaathala (1998)
 Rojavanam (1999)
 Enge Enadhu Kavithai (2002)
 Anbe Vaa (2005)
 Thaka Thimi Tha (2005)
 Maharaja (2011)
 Thillu Mullu (2013)

Television
Kalki (Jaya TV)
Jannal - Marabu Kavithaigal (Raj TV)

Singer

References

 Official Website of M S Viswanathan
 Filmography of M S Viswanathan at OneIndia

External links
 

Discographies of Indian artists
Discographies